Robert Throckmorton may refer to:

Sir Robert Throckmorton (c. 1513–1581)
Sir Robert Throckmorton, 1st Baronet (1599–1650)
Sir Robert Throckmorton, 8th Baronet (1800–1862)